Platysmaplasty, commonly referred to as a neck lift, is a form of cosmetic plastic surgery involving tightening and removing skin from the human neck.

Because it doesn't often follow a predictable pattern of aging, neck lift surgery must be tailored to each patient's specific needs. Loss of collagen is a major contributor to facial aging, and the neck is certainly no exception. As the aging process progresses, collagen production declines and the skin becomes lax, sags, and looks wrinkled. With time, neck muscles also weaken causing a "turkey wattle" appearance. The thin skin of the neck is also especially vulnerable to creases and lines. Neck lifts tend to last 7-10 years and can be repeated in the future if necessary.

See also 
 Rhytidectomy (face lift)

References 

Plastic surgery